Shrimant Raja Shankarrao Chimnajirao Gandekar, was the 10th ruler of the princely state of Bhor of British Raj during the reign (12 February 1871 – 17 July 1922).

With Doctrine of lapse of the Satara State in 1849, the Pant Sachiv became a tributary of the British Government. In 1820, a Treaty was concluded between the British Government (East India Company). As original British grantee of 1820, Chimnajirao Raghunathrao was made the ruler of Bhor. On 20 July 1874, Shankarrao Chimnajirao Pant Sachiv was installed with full ruling powers on Bhor State.

Early years
Shankarrao Chimnajirao Pant Sachiv was born to Chimnajirao Raghunathrao Pant Sachiv (9th Ruler of Bhor) on 30 March 1854. In 1867 he joined the Poona High School for further studies, which lasted till he came to the Gadi with full powers of Bhor State.

Minority Administration
Shrimant Raosaheb was 17 years when his father died in 1871. The British Government there upon entrusted the management of the state affairs to his mother Maisaheb as the Regent, who was assisted in her work by two Karbharis, One is appointed by the state government and the other by the British Raj. However Ranisheb Maisaheb died in the year 1873, and the British government on seeing Raosaheb come of age, handed over to him the rulership of his State with full powers in July 1874.

Marriage
Raosaheb married daughter of Sardar Madhavrao Vithal Vinchurkar in 1861, but she died with Cholera within a month after a marriage. Then Raosheb the following year married Jijibai Ranisaheb the daughter of Sardar Krishnarao Vitthal Vinchurkar of the same family.

Titles
Shankarrao Chimnajirao Gandekar was also known with his full name His Highness, Meherban, Shrimant, Raja Shankarrao Chimnajirao Gandekar Pandit Pant Sachiv, Raja of Bhor

Honours
In 1903, he was honored with King Edward VII Coronation Medal.
He attended the 1903 Delhi Durbar, and received the Delhi Durbar Medal – Silver, 1903
In the 1903 Durbar Honours he received the grant of a personal salute of 9 guns.
In 1911, he was awarded with King George V Coronation Medal.
Delhi Durbar Medal – Silver, 1911.
 In 1911, he was granted 11-gun salute and honoured with the titles "His Highness" and "Raja".

References

Bibliography

External links

1854 births
1922 deaths
Bhor State